The 2004 Ukrainian child pornography raids occurred a few months before the First Orange Revolution, when police in Ukraine raided a softcore child pornography ring operating in the cities of Kyiv, Kharkiv, and Simferopol.  The ring had operated since 2001 and used a modeling agency as a front.

The Crime Investigation Department of the Ministry for the Interior conducted the raids. The deputy head of the department, Vitaly Yarema, said that the bank accounts of the agency, containing hundreds of thousands of dollars, had been frozen.

The raids were conducted after a joint investigation between Ukrainian police and Interpol. In 2005, the United States Department of State announced that there was further cooperation between Ukrainian police and other law enforcement agencies internationally.

The investigation following the raids was completed by 6 April 2005.

References

External links
 
 
 
 
 

child pornography raids
Child pornography crackdowns
Crime in Ukraine
Mass media in Ukraine